Quel movimento che mi piace tanto (That movement which I love so much) is a 1976 Italian commedia sexy all'italiana written and directed by Franco Rossetti. It marked the film debut, both as actor and as assistant director, of Carlo Verdone.

Cast 

 Carlo Giuffrè: Lawyer Fabrizio Siniscalchi 
 Martine Brochard: Livia Bonoli-Serpieri 
 Renzo Montagnani: Marquis Cecco Ottobuoni 
 Cinzia Monreale: Anna Gilioli 
 Francesca Benedetti: Lucia Guarnieri aka 'Lucy' 
 Enzo Cannavale: Salvatore Siniscalchi 
 Carlo Verdone: Man at the Bar

See also 
 
 List of Italian films of 1976

References

External links

Quel movimento che mi piace tanto at Variety Distribution

1976 films
1970s sex comedy films
1970s Italian-language films
Commedia sexy all'italiana
1976 comedy films
Films scored by Manuel De Sica
1970s Italian films